Dr. Safvet-beg Bašagić (6 May 1870 – 9 April 1934), also known as Mirza Safvet, was a Bosnian writer who is often described by Bosniak historians as the "father of Bosnian Renaissance", and one of the most renowned poets of Bosnia and Herzegovina at the turn of the 20th century. Bašagić co-founded the political journal Behar and was a founder of the cultural society and magazine Gajret, and was elected President of the Bosnian council in 1910. He is also well known for his oeuvre that exceeded seven hundred biographies he compiled over decades.

Life

A Bosniak, he was born in Nevesinje on 6 May 1870. He finished his primary schooling in Konjic, Mostar, and Sarajevo. He received his doctorate at the University of Vienna, where he studied Arabic and Persian languages. Bašagić was installed as the first parliamentary president of the Muslim National organization in 1908. He taught Oriental languages at the University of Zagreb and was an associate of Silvije Strahimir Kranjčević. As president of the Diet of Bosnia, Bašagić advocated either a unification of Bosnia and Herzegovina with Croatia or autonomy. Bašagić was curator of the Archeological Museum in Sarajevo from 1919 to 1927.

Bašagić died in 1934 in Sarajevo and is buried in the harem of Gazi Husrev-beg's Mosque.

Works
The Bašagić collection of Islamic manuscripts and old books, which can be found in the holdings of the University Library in Bratislava, was inscribed on UNESCO's Memory of the World Register in 1997. Part of this collection is available on-line from the World Digital Library. and Digital Library of the University Library in Bratislava.

Bašagić collection of Islamic manuscripts

Safvet-beg Bašagić - a collector, literary, journalist, poet, translator, professor, bibliographer, curator of a museum, politician - a Bosnian intellectual, who preserved in his works and collections an image of Bosnian literature and Muslim literary heritage. His collection of Islamic manuscripts and prints comprises Arabic, Persian and Turkish works and rare Serbian and Croatian texts written in Arabic script. Bašagić's collection contains, at the same time, unique manuscripts and essential works of medieval Islamic scholarly literature and belles-lettres, spanning the interval from 12th to 19th century, and prints from two centuries, starting from 1729. The 284 manuscript volumes and 365 printed volumes portray the more than a thousand year long development of Islamic civilization from its commencement to the beginning of 20th century. Especially the authorship and language aspect of the collection represents a bridge between different cultures and a certain overlap thereof.
The very history of the journey of Bašagić's collection of Islamic manuscripts and prints was dramatic and its termination almost unbelievable. Bašagić tried to deposit the collection in a more secure place than was the Balkan region of his time. In the turmoil of the turbulent development of Balkan nations in 19th and 20th centuries, his valuable collection eventually found its haven of rest in the funds of the University Library in Bratislava.
The University Library in Bratislava makes considerable provisions for the protection of Bašagić's collection documents that are adequate to its worth and value. The whole fund of the collection has been professionally expertised by Czech and Slovak scholars and is carefully stored and used for scientific purposes.  In order to adequately protect the original documents and so to preserve them for the next generations and, at the same time, to enable the unprofessional and scholarly public to use them, the Library has decided to digitalize the collection and publish it in an electronic form. Many items of the collection are available online.

Bibliography
Trofanda iz hercegovačke dubrave (1894)
Kratka uputa u prošlost Bosne i Hercegovine (1463-1850) (1900)
Abdullah-paša (1900)
Pod ozijom ili krvava nagrada (1905)
Misli i čuvstva (1905)
Gazi Husrev-beg (1907)
Uzgredne bilješke I (1907)
Najstariji ferman begova Čengića (1907)
Bošnjaci i Hercegovci u islamskoj književnosti I (Bosniaks and Herzegovinians in Islamic literature) (1912)
Izabrane pjesme (1913)
Opis orijentalnih rukopisa moje biblioteke (1917)
Nizamul-Alem (translation, 1919)
Najstarija turska vijest o Kosovkom boju (1924)
Mevlud (1924)
Omer Hajjam: Rubaije (translation, 1928)
Znameniti Hrvati - Bošnjaci i Hercegovci u Turskoj carevini (Illustrious Croats - Bosniaks and Herzegovinians in the Ottoman empire) (1931)

References
Citations

Bibliography

External links
 

1870 births
1934 deaths
People from Nevesinje
Bosniaks of Bosnia and Herzegovina
Bosnia and Herzegovina Muslims
University of Vienna alumni
Academic staff of the University of Zagreb
Translators of Omar Khayyám
Bosniak writers
Bosniak poets
Bosnia and Herzegovina writers
Bosnia and Herzegovina orientalists